Seo Ji-hye (born August 24, 1984) is a South Korean actress. After first attracting attention in the horror film Voice (2005), Seo has since starred in numerous television dramas, notably 49 Days (2011), Punch (2014), Don't Dare to Dream (2016), Crash Landing on You (2019), and Red Balloon (2022–2023).

Filmography

Film

Television series

Web series

Awards and nominations

References

External links 

 
 

South Korean film actresses
South Korean television actresses
Sungkyunkwan University alumni
1984 births
Living people
21st-century South Korean actresses